Moras is a surname. Notable people with the name Moras or de Moras include:

 Marie-Angélique Frémyn de Moras (1676–1763), French courtier and memoirist
 Abraham Peyrenc de Moras (1684–1732), French banker
 Walter Moras (1856–1925), German painter
 Bernard Blasius Moras (born 1941), Indian prelate of the Roman Catholic Church
 Dino Moras (born 1944), French biochemist
 Karen Moras (born 1954), Australian Olympic distance freestyle swimmer
 Narelle Moras (born 1956), Australian Olympic freestyle swimmer
 Carolina de Moras (born 1981), Chilean model, actress and television presenter
 Davide Moras (born 1981), Italian metal and rock singer also known as Damna or Damnagoras
 Vangelis Moras (born 1981), Greek football player
 Sarah Moras (born 1988), Canadian mixed martial artist